Tsintsabis is a settlement of about 4,000 inhabitants in the Oshikoto Region of Namibia. The settlement features a clinic and a police station. Tsintsabis is not a proclaimed settlement. It is situated on farm land, some of which has been obtained by government to resettle landless people. The area is inhabited predominantly by San people but also by Damara, Ovambo and people from the Kavango Region.

Development and infrastructure
The place is riddled with poverty and alcohol abuse. Apart from farms surrounding the settlement there are no job opportunities such that many of the residents live on government handouts. Tsintsabis Combined School is the only school in the area. It offers classes up to Grade 10. The school had had bad pass rates in the past.

References

Populated places in the Oshikoto Region
Farms in Namibia